USS Roanoke (CL-145) was the second ship of the  light cruisers completed for the U.S. Navy shortly after the end of World War II. Commissioned in 1949, she served in the Atlantic, Mediterranean and Pacific before being decommissioned in 1958.  She was sold for scrap in 1972.

Construction and Commissioning

Roanoke was laid down on 15 May 1945 by the New York Shipbuilding Corp., Camden, New Jersey; launched 16 June 1947; sponsored by Miss Julia Ann Henebry; and commissioned at Philadelphia 4 April 1949.

Following a shakedown cruise in the Caribbean, Roanoke undertook maneuvers in the Atlantic as a unit of the Battleship-Cruiser Force and on 6 January 1950 got underway to join the 6th Fleet in the Mediterranean for her first extended deployment. Returning to the United States in May, she alternated 6th Fleet deployments with operations in the western Atlantic until the summer of 1952 when she added a midshipman's cruise to Europe and the Caribbean to her schedule. Continuing to operate in the Battleship-Cruiser Force, U.S. Atlantic Fleet until the fall of 1955, Roanoke completed her sixth Mediterranean deployment in May, then prepared for transfer to the Pacific Fleet.

On 22 September 1955, Roanoke departed Norfolk, Va., for the Panama Canal. Homeported at Long Beach, she conducted nine Naval Reserve cruises and completed three WestPac cruises, May to December 1956, September 1957 to March 1958, and September to October 1958, before decommissioning 31 October 1958.

Decommissioning 
She was berthed at Mare Island in 1963 until sold to the Levin Metals Corporation of San Jose, California on 22 February 1972.

Her bell can be seen on displayed outside of Elmwood Park which is inside Roanoke Public Library. Roanoke’s model is on display in Virginia Museum of Transportation, Roanoke, Virginia.

Awards
Navy Occupation Medal with (Europe clasp)
National Defense Service Medal

Gallery

References

External links

 

 

Worcester-class cruisers
Ships built by New York Shipbuilding Corporation
1947 ships
Cold War cruisers of the United States